The 1st Louisiana Native Guard was a Confederate Louisianan militia that consisted of Creoles of color. Formed in 1861 in New Orleans, Louisiana, it was disbanded on April 25, 1862. Some of the unit's members joined the Union Army's 1st Louisiana Native Guard, which later became the 73rd Regiment Infantry of the United States Colored Troops.

Confederate Louisiana militia
Shortly after Louisiana's secession, Governor Thomas Overton Moore issued pleas for troops on April 17 and April 21, 1861.  In response to the governor's request, a committee of ten prominent New Orleanian Creoles of color called a meeting at the Catholic Institute on April 22.  About two thousand people attended the meeting where muster lists were opened, with about 1,500 gens de couleur signing up.  Governor Moore accepted the services of these men as part of the state's militia.

The new militia regiment was formed during May 1861, consisting mostly of French Creoles of color. While some members of the new regiment came from wealthy prominent Creole families, a majority of the men were clerks, artisans, and skilled laborers. Louisiana and New Orleans had an estimated 25,000 free Creole of color residents.

On May 29, 1861, Governor Moore appointed three white officers as commanders of the regiment, and company commanders were appointed from among the Creoles of the regiment. The militia unit was the first of any in North America to have officers of color, preceding the United States Colored Troops. This regiment was called the Louisiana Native Guard. Though ten per cent of its members would later join the Union Army's 1st Louisiana Native Guard, the two were separate military units.

Activities 

The Native Guards were volunteers, and as such supplied their own arms and uniforms.  These were displayed in a grand review of troops in New Orleans on November 23, 1861, and again on January 8, 1862.  They offered their services to escort Union prisoners (captured at the First Battle of Bull Run) through New Orleans. Confederate General David Twiggs declined the offer, but thanked them for the "promptness with which they answered the call."  The Louisiana State Legislature passed a law in January 1862 that reorganized the militia into only “...free white males capable of bearing arms… ”

The Native Guards regiment was affected by this law.  It was forced to disband on February 15, 1862, when the new law took effect.  "Their demise was only temporary, however, for Governor Moore reinstated the Native Guards on March 24 after the U.S. Navy under Admiral David G. Farragut entered the Mississippi River."
As the regular Confederate forces under Major General Mansfield Lovell abandoned New Orleans, the militia units were left to fend for themselves.  The Native Guards were again, and in finality, ordered to disband by General John L. Lewis, of the Louisiana Militia, on April 25, 1862, as Federal ships arrived opposite the city.  General Lewis cautioned them to hide their arms and uniforms before returning home.

Notable members 
 Felix Labatut (Colonel)-  State senator, soldier, and signer of Louisiana's declaration of secession.
 Armand Lanusse (Captain)-  Soldier, educator, writer.  The prime motivator in the formation of the Native Guards Regiment.
 André Cailloux, who later became a hero of the Siege of Port Hudson as a Union officer, served as a lieutenant in this Confederate Louisiana militia regiment of the Native Guard.

Companies 
Companies of the Confederate 1st Louisiana Native Guard prior to disbanding in 1862:

See also
List of Louisiana Confederate Civil War units
Military history of African Americans in the American Civil War

References

 Hollandsworth, James G., The Louisiana Native Guards, LSU Press, 1996.
 Trethewey, Natasha. Native Guard. Houghton-Mifflin, 2006.
 Holden, Randall G., "Futile Valor", MCG Publishing, 1997

External links
Black Soldiers in Louisiana Collection at The Historic New Orleans Collection 

Units and formations of the Confederate States Army from Louisiana
African-American military units and formations of the American Civil War
1861 establishments in Louisiana
Military units and formations established in 1861